Air Marshal Sir Patrick Henry Lyon Playfair,  (22 November 1889 – 23 November 1974) was a commander in the Royal Flying Corps during the First World War and a senior commander in the Royal Air Force until his retirement during the Second World War.

In 1945 he published Warfare Today: How Modern Battles Are Planned and Fought on Land, at Sea, and in the Air, co-written by Major General J. F. C. Fuller and Admiral Sir Reginald Bacon.

References

External links
 Air of Authority – A History of RAF Organisation – Air Marshal Sir Patrick Playfair

Further reading
 
 .

|-

|-

1889 births
1974 deaths
Chevaliers of the Légion d'honneur
Commanders of the Royal Victorian Order
Companions of the Order of the Bath
Knights Commander of the Order of the British Empire
Recipients of the Distinguished Service Medal (US Army)
Recipients of the Military Cross
Royal Air Force air marshals of World War II
Royal Air Force personnel of World War I
Royal Field Artillery officers
Royal Flying Corps officers